Muhammad Qamar Abbas Rizvi is a Pakistani politician who had been a Member of the Provincial Assembly of Sindh, from June 2016 to May 2018.

Early life and education
He was born on 1 July 1961 in Karachi. He served as an Army officer in the Sindh Regiment until 2005,

He has a degree of Bachelor of Arts and a degree of Master of Arts, both from Karachi University.

He also has a Master of Business Administration degree from Preston University.

Political career

He was elected to the Provincial Assembly of Sindh as a candidate of Mutahida Quami Movement from Constituency PS-117 KARACHI-XXIX in by-polls held in June 2016.

References

Living people
Sindh MPAs 2013–2018
1961 births
Muttahida Qaumi Movement politicians
University of Karachi alumni